This is a list of wars involving  Malaysia.

List

References 

Malaysia
Wars